The Do Meio River is a river of Bahia state in eastern Brazil.  It is a tributary of the Peruípe River (Braço Sul).

See also
List of rivers of Bahia

References

Rivers of Bahia